Askari Mohammadian (born 2 March 1963) is a retired Iranian freestyle wrestler. He won gold medals at the 1983 Asian Championships and 1986 Asian Games, placing second at the 1982 Asian Games, 1988 and 1992 Olympics, 1989 world and 1989 Asian Championships. His 1988 Olympic silver was the only medal for Iran at those Games.

He is the father of World bronze medalist Mohammad Hossein Mohammadian.

References

1963 births
Living people
Olympic wrestlers of Iran
Olympic silver medalists for Iran
Wrestlers at the 1988 Summer Olympics
Wrestlers at the 1992 Summer Olympics
Iranian male sport wrestlers
Asian Games gold medalists for Iran
Asian Games silver medalists for Iran
Olympic medalists in wrestling
Asian Games medalists in wrestling
Wrestlers at the 1982 Asian Games
Wrestlers at the 1986 Asian Games
World Wrestling Championships medalists
Medalists at the 1992 Summer Olympics
Medalists at the 1988 Summer Olympics
People from Sari, Iran
Medalists at the 1982 Asian Games
Medalists at the 1986 Asian Games
Sportspeople from Sari, Iran
20th-century Iranian people
21st-century Iranian people